De-oligarchization (also known as Ze-Oligarchization) - the program of the President of Ukraine, Volodymyr Zelensky, directed against the large entrepreneurs's influence on political processes. It received the corresponding name after the registration of the bill “On the Prevention of Threats to National Security Related to the Excessive Influence of Persons who have Significant Economic or Political Weight in Public Life (Oligarchs)” (Reg. No. 5599).

Key Purpose 
The law on oligarchs is designed to create a special register of persons depending on their fortune level and involvement in social and political processes in the country. Preliminary, the register must include 13 people, whom the state will limit the ability to finance political parties and participate in the acquisition of state-owned enterprises on an equal basis with other citizens.

According to the bill, the basis for the inclusion of oligarchs into the register will be the National Security and Defense Council (NSDC) decision. 

According to the document, any three of the four conditions are sufficient for the NSDC to include a person into a register of oligarchs: 

 excessive influence on the media;
 participation in political life;
 beneficial ownership of a monopoly company;
 a fortune of over 1 million living wages (about $83 million at the current exchange rate).

Persons included into the register will be banned from making contributions (directly or indirectly through other persons) in support of political parties, and being a buyer (beneficiary of the buyer) in the process of privatization of large-scale privatization objects.

Consideration of the bill in the Parliament 

The Verkhovna Rada passed the first reading of president's bill No. 5599 on oligarchs on July 1 2021. Some 275 MPs voted for the document at an extraordinary plenary session of the parliament.

In the second reading and in general The Verkhovna Rada has adopted Law on September 23 2021 by 279 lawmakers votes.

The Chairman of the Verkhovna Rada of Ukraine Dmitro Razumkov informed that the voting process in the Verkhovna Rada for the project was held in violation of the rules. According to Dmytro Razumkov, the initiators of such a review process misled people's deputies, but did not vote for it themselves, as they understand the responsibility for such actions.  Moreover, according to him, the "hasty adoption" of the anti-oligarchs law has led to inconsistencies in the document.

Request to the Venice Commission 
Chairman of the Verkhovna Rada of Ukraine Dmytro Razumkov submitted bill No. 5599 on oligarchs for the conclusion to the European Commission For Democracy through Law (Venice Commission) on September 10 2021. This was done in accordance with the demands of the Ombudsman and 4 out of 5 opposition factions in the Parliament.

On September 15 2021 the Venice Commission confirmed the existence of an appeal from Ukraine regarding this bill. The Venice Commission will present its conclusion to the draft law regarding its observance of human rights by December 15 2021.

Criticism of the Bill 
Verkhovna Rada of Ukraine Commissioner for Human Rights Liudmyla Denisova had concluded that the bill on oligarchs provisions do not comply with the Constitution of Ukraine, and their implementation will lead to violations of human and civil rights and freedoms.

Fareed Zakaria, a journalist, political commentator and the host of CNN’s weekly public affairs show said, that the Bill on oligarchs creates risks for freedom of speech in Ukraine.

Swedish economist Anders Aslund also voiced his concerns about such bill on ‘de-oligarchization’ submitted to the Verkhovna Rada by the Ukrainian president. He argued the move emulates the policies of  Vladimir Putin in early 2000s when media assets were snatched up from oligarchs like Berezovsky and handed over to more loyal businessmen.

British historian Niall Ferguson called Zelensky’s bill a ‘dangerous precedent’, attempting to create exceptional laws for specific social groups.

References 

Politics of Ukraine
Oligarchy